Jamie Baldridge (born May 24, 1975) is an American photographer and arts educator. He creates highly manipulated and surreal tableau vivant photographs. He is currently a professor of Photography in the Visual Arts Department at the University of Louisiana at Lafayette.

Life and work
Jamie Baldridge was born and raised in New Iberia, Louisiana on May 24, 1975. He was raised in a conservative, Catholic household. He went on to study at Louisiana State University at Baton Rouge where he received both his Bachelor of Fine Arts and later his Master of Fine Arts degree.

He is known for creating highly manipulated surreal tableau vivant photography. Baldridge's work references many literary, philosophical, religious, and artistic themes such as the symbolism and psychology of dream imagery, the frangibility of relationships, altered states of consciousness, Jungian archetypes, and esoteric tales and fables. "He has filtered those loaded fables through his subconscious, tempered them with dystopia, tasty fetishes and research gleaned from the musty stacks of Latin scholarship, and emerged with (a) painterly surrealistic vision." He cites Leonora Carrington, Søren Kierkegaard, Joseph Campbell, Salvador Dalí, Pablo Picasso, Remedios Varo, Edward Gorey, and the Epic of Gilgamesh as but a few of his varied inspirations. His subjects, usually female (because he is trying to lose his virginity), often have their faces and/or heads obscured allowing the viewer greater opportunity for symbolic interpretations of identity and challenging accepted preconceptions about the genre of portraiture. Baldridge's works are often accompanied by narratives written in a very purple and baroque prose which serve to describe the point of peripety represented in the image itself.

He was named by Oxford American magazine in 2012, one of the new "100 superstars of Southern art".

Publications
2008 – The Everywhere Chronicles (artist photography book with writings). Jamie Baldridge. New York: 21st Editions
2013 – Almost Fiction. Jamie Baldridge (artist photography book with foreword by Graham Nash) San Francisco: Modernbook Editions

Exhibitions

Solo exhibitions
2008 –Informed Visions, Millenia Fine Art Orlando, Orlando, Florida
2009 – Dystopia, Camara Oscura galeria de arte Madrid, Spain
2009 – The Everywhere Chronicles, Galerie Utrecht, Amsterdam, Netherlands
2010 – Pilgrims & Peregrines, Richard Goodall Gallery, Manchester, United Kingdom
2010 – Belle Epoque, Taylor Bercier Fine Art New Orleans, Louisiana
2013 – Playing with Arsenic, Camara Oscura galeria de arte, Madrid, Spain
2013 – Almost Fiction, Modernbook Gallery, San Francisco, California

Two-person exhibitions
2007 – Jamie Baldridge & Adam Farrington, Taylor Bercier Fine Art, New Orleans, Louisiana
2009 – Magic Realism, exhibition with Sergio Fasol, Schneider Contemporary Photography, Chicago, Illinois
2012 – VS., exhibition with Bernhard Buhmann, Carbon 12 Gallery, Dubai, United Arab Emirates

Selected group exhibitions
2011 – India Art Summit, Carbon 12 Gallery, New Delhi, India
2013–2014 – Decisive Moments, Honolulu Museum of Art, Honolulu, Hawaii
2015 – MORPHEE II, Acte2rivegauche, Paris, France

References

1975 births
Living people
21st-century American photographers
American digital artists
American surrealist artists
People from New Iberia, Louisiana
Photographers from Louisiana
University of Louisiana at Lafayette faculty